Tore Haugen (born 1 October 1931 in Askim) is a Norwegian politician for the Conservative Party.

He was elected to the Norwegian Parliament from Akershus in 1989, and was re-elected on one occasion. He had previously served in the position of deputy representative during the term 1977–1981.

Haugen was a deputy member of Oppegård municipality council in 1963–1967, but became mayor in the periods 1969–1971 and 1971–1975. He was a member of Akershus county council in 1969–1971, and later served as county mayor during the terms 1979–1983 and 1983–1987.

Outside politics he graduated with the cand.jur. degree in 1958 and spent most of his professional career in Prisdirektoratet. He was appointed to the Office of the Auditor General of Norway from 1994 to 2002. He was also chairman of the board of the Norwegian State Railways from 1984 to 1989.

References

1931 births
Living people
Members of the Storting
Conservative Party (Norway) politicians
Mayors of places in Akershus
Chairmen of County Councils of Norway
People from Oppegård
20th-century Norwegian politicians
People from Askim